Naval Station Mobile is a former station of the United States Navy. It opened in 1985 during the creation of the Strategic Homeport program under the administration of President Ronald Reagan. In 1991, the homeport was closed, as part of declining funding under the Base Realignment and Closure Commission (1989).

References

Naval Stations of the United States Navy
Military installations in Alabama
Buildings and structures in Mobile, Alabama
1985 establishments in the United States
Military installations closed in 1994

Closed installations of the United States Navy